Houseparty is a studio album by American R&B and boogie-woogie pianist and vocalist Little Willie Littlefield.

Content
The album was recorded at The Farmsound Studio in Heelsum in the Netherlands in June 1982 and released in 1982 on the Dutch record label Oldie Blues (OL 8003). The album was produced by Martin van Olderen.

Track listing
Side one
 "Beggin'"
 "Houseparty"
 "Honky Tonk Train Blues"
 "Just Relax"
 "Chief Boogie Woogie"
 "Raining"
 "Swanee River Boogie"

Side two
 "Farmsound Boogie"
 "San Antonio Rose"
 "Holland Boogie Wiggle"
 "Walking Through The Streets"
 "There's Good Rocking Tonight"
 "After Hours"
 "Willie Rolls the Boogie"

Personnel
 Little Willie Littlefield - piano, vocals
 Tony Littlefield - vocals
 Harry Noordhof - bass
 Diederik van Hamersveld - drums

References

External links
 Houseparty at Discogs
 

Little Willie Littlefield albums
Oldie Blues albums
1982 albums